SS Eclipse may refer to:

 , a Type C2-S-AJ1 ship built by North Carolina Shipbuilding; transferred to the United States Navy in December 1943; as USS Mount Olympus (AGC-8) was the lead ship of her class of command ship; scrapped in 1973

Ship names